was a village located in Yama District, Fukushima Prefecture, Japan.

As of 2003, the village had an estimated population of 3,446 and a density of 21.95 persons per km². The total area was 156.98 km².

On January 4, 2006, Atsushiokanō, along with the towns of Shiokawa and Yamato, and the village of Takasato (all from Yama District), was merged into the expanded city of Kitakata.

External links
 Kitakata official website 

Dissolved municipalities of Fukushima Prefecture
Kitakata, Fukushima